Microsoft Forefront Identity Manager (FIM) is a state-based identity management software product, designed to manage users' digital identities, credentials and groupings throughout the lifecycle of their membership of an enterprise computer system. FIM integrates with Active Directory and Exchange Server to provide identity synchronization, certificate management, user password resets and user provisioning from a single interface.

Overview
Part of the Microsoft Identity and Access Management platform product line, FIM superseded Microsoft Identity Lifecycle Manager (ILM), and was known as ILM 2 during development. ILM 2007 was created by merging Microsoft Identity Integration Server 2003 (MIIS) and Certificate Lifecycle Manager (CLM).

FIM 2010 utilizes Windows Workflow Foundation concepts, using transactional workflows to manage and propagate changes to a user's state-based identity. This is in contrast to most of the transaction-based competing products that do not have a state-based element. Administrators not only can create workflows with the web-based GUI of ILM 2 portal but also include more complex workflows designed outside of the portal by importing XAML files

FIM 2010 R2 (Release 2) was released in June 2012 and has extra capabilities:
 Improved Self-service Password Reset which supports all current web browsers
 Role Based Access Control (RBAC) via the acquisition of BHOLD Software
 Improvement to the Reporting engine via the System Center Service Manager and MS SQL Server reporting Services (SSRS)
 A WebServices Connector to connect to SAP ECC 5/6, Oracle PeopleSoft, and Oracle eBusiness
 Improvements in the areas of performance, simplified deployment and troubleshooting, better documentation, and more language support.

Codeless Provisioning
Forefront Identity Manager introduces the concept of "codeless provisioning" which allows administrators to create objects in any connected data source without writing any code in one of the .NET Framework languages.

The codeless provisioning provided in FIM should be able to sustain most of the simple to medium complexity scenarios for account lifecycle management. FIM fully honors existing MIIS implementations and supports "traditional" coded provisioning side-by-side with code-less provisioning methods.

See also
 Microsoft Identity Integration Server
 Password Change Notification Service
 NetIQ Identity Manager

References

External links
 
 Certificate Lifecycle Manager Overview
 FIM Resources on the Microsoft TechNet Wiki
 FIM Best Practices Volume 1: Introduction, Architecture and Installation of Forefront Identity Manager 2010

Identity management systems
Internet Protocol based network software
Workflow applications
Identity Integration Server
2010 software